Ants Veetõusme (born 3 May 1949 in Tallinn) is an Estonian politician, fencer, and financial and sports figure.

Veetõusme graduated from Tartu State University in 1972 with a degree in finance and credit. From 1991 until 1993, he was the Mayor of Tartu.

From 1991 until 2004, he was the president of Estonian Fencing Association.

In 2002, he was awarded with Order of the National Coat of Arms, IV Class. In 2006, he was awarded with Order of the National Coat of Arms, III Class.

References

Living people
1949 births
Estonian politicians
Mayors of Tartu
Estonian businesspeople
Voters of the Estonian restoration of Independence
Recipients of the Order of the National Coat of Arms, 3rd Class
Recipients of the Order of the National Coat of Arms, 4th Class
University of Tartu alumni
People from Tallinn
Politicians from Tallinn
Sportspeople from Tallinn